Mydas xanthopterus is a species of mydas flies in the family Mydidae.

Mydas xanthopterus occur in North America (Mexico and the United States). They resemble red-winged Pepsis species and are possibly Batesian mimics. They occur in sympatry with Pepsis grossa.

References

Mydidae
Diptera of North America
Insects described in 1866
Taxa named by Hermann Loew
Articles created by Qbugbot